Walter Peak is a mountain located near Queenstown, New Zealand.

It is regularly visited by the TSS Earnslaw steamship, which takes passengers to the base of the mountain to visit the Walter Peak High Country Farm. The Colonel's homestead, close to the steamships destination, is also popular and serves lunch and dinner.

See also
List of mountains of New Zealand by height

References

External links
TSS Earnslaw and Walter Peak High Country Farm

Mountains of Otago
Queenstown-Lakes District
Southern Alps